By-elections for Five state assembly constituencies were held in Manipur on 7 November 2020.

Background
Thirteen seats of the Manipur Legislative Assembly fell vacant after disqualification and mass resignation of Congress MLAs after which thirteen seats fell vacant.

On 10 November 2020, the election of one of these disqualified MLAs (Yengkhom Surchandra Singh, from the Kakching constituency) was declared null and void by the Manipur High Court; as a result, the BJP candidate in that election, who had come in second place, replaced Singh as MLA, so that the number of vacant seats went down to 12.

Schedule
The first phase of the by-elections for 5 constituencies of the Manipur Legislative Assembly has been announced.

Result

See also
2020 Madhya Pradesh Legislative Assembly by-elections

References

State Assembly elections in Manipur
2020s in Manipur
Manipur
2020